Coleophora morosa is a moth of the family Coleophoridae, and a member of the order Lepidoptera. It is found in eastern Siberia.

Appearance 
C. morosa has long tan wings and antennae. It has three long legs on each side of its body. It has stripes going down its wings, however they are not very prominent.

References

morosa
Moths described in 1993
Moths of Asia